DNA‐templated organic synthesis (DTS) is a way to control the reactivity of synthetic molecules by using nature's molarity‐based approach. Historically, DTS was used as a model of prebiotic nucleic acid replication. Now however, it is capable of translating DNA sequences into complex small‐molecule and polymer products of multistep organic synthesis.

Base Editors
The DNA base editors, developed at Harvard University under David Liu, allow altering the genomic structure of DNA. The base editors include BE3, BE4 and ABE7.

BE3 and its later version, BE4 allow to change the nucleobase C to T and nucleobase G to A. ABE7 allows to change A-T base pairs into G-C base pairs. The system works by rearranging the atoms in the target base pair and then tricking cells into fixing the other DNA strand to make the change permanent.

References

Biological engineering
Biotechnology
Emerging technologies

Genome editing
Molecular biology